Chanvelly is a village and panchayat in Ranga Reddy district, Telangana, India. It falls under the mandal of Chevella. Chanvelly depends exclusively on agriculture. The only temple in the village is Spatika (Transparent) Lingam , Hanuman temple, Nava Grahalu and Amma Vari temple

References

Villages in Ranga Reddy district